Equine encephalomyelitis may refer to:

 Eastern equine encephalitis virus
 Western equine encephalitis virus
 Venezuelan equine encephalitis virus

See also
 Viral encephalitis